A variety of dairy products are indigenous to India and an important part of Indian cuisine. The majority of these products can be broadly classified into curdled products, like chhena, or non-curdled products, like khoa.

Curdled dairy products

 Paneer is an unaged, acid-set, non-melting farmer cheese made by curdling heated milk with lemon juice or other non-rennet food acid, and then removing the whey and pressing the result into a dry unit. It is a popular ingredient of North Indian cuisine.
Chhena is like paneer, except some whey is left and the mixture is beaten thoroughly until it becomes soft, of smooth consistency, and malleable but firm. It is popular in eastern India & neighbouring Bangladesh.
Chhena Poda is a roasted, sweetened and tightly packed Chhena. It is popular in the east Indian state of Odisha
Chhena gaja is a combination of chhena and sooji (semolina). Then molded into palm-sized rectangular shapes (gajas), boiled in thick sugar syrup. It is popular in the east Indian state of Odisha
Rasabali is a deep fried flattened reddish brown patties of chhena that are soaked in thickened, sweetened milk. It is popular in Odisha.
Sandesh is a confection made from chhena mixed with sugar then grilled lightly to caramelize, but removed from heat and molded into a ball or some shape. It is the staple sweetmeat of the Indian state of West Bengal alongside neighbouring Bangladesh.
 Rasgulla is a confection made from mixture of chhena and semolina rolled into a ball and boiled in syrup. It is the staple sweetmeat of the Indian states of West Bengal & Odisha alongside neighbouring Bangladesh.
Khira Sagara literally means ocean of milk. It is the mixture of small balls of Chhena in sweetened milk. It is popular in Odisha.

Non-curdled dairy products

 Khoa or Mawa is made by reducing milk in an open pan over heat.
 Kheer (Bengali sweets) is a Bengali version of Khoa, but it is less harder than khoa and it has a doughy texture rather than the solid texture of Khoa.  
 Peda is a confection made by mixing sugar with khoa and adding flavoring, such as cardamom.  
 Barfi is a confection made by reducing milk and sugar until it solidifies and adding flavoring, such as pistachio.
 Gulab jamun is a confection made by mixing khoa and sugar, caramelizing it by frying, and soaking it in syrup containing rosewater.
 Kulfi is made from slowly freezing sweetened condensed milk.  In comparison to ice cream, kulfi is not whipped or otherwise aerated.
 Ghee is type of clarified butter that is cooked long enough to caramelize the milk sugar and sterilize the liquid.

Fermented dairy products
 Mishti doi is dahi  mixed with sugar
 Shrikhand is strained yogurt mixed with sugar, and often flavorings such as cardamom, saffron, or fruit.
 Wheyvit is an alcoholic beverage prepared by fermenting whey with yeast.

Other dairy products

 Kheer is made by boiling rice or broken wheat with milk and sugar, and sometimes flavored with cardamom, raisins, saffron, pistachios, or almonds.
 Chhena Murki is made by frying cubes of chhena to burn the outside, then soaking them in syrup flavored with cardamom.
 Pantooa is like gulab jamun, except with some chhena mixed with the usual ingredients.
A2 Milk is produced only from Desi Girl Cow with hump. It has A2 protein beneficial for human body. 
Vedic A2 Ghee is made through an ancient vedic method which is hand churning the curd made from Girl Cow A2 milk.
Basundi is also made up from milk.

See also

 Dairy in India
 List of dairy products

References

 http://www.dairyforall.com/indian-dairy-products.php

Further reading